Edward Walkington was an Anglican bishop in the late seventeenth century.

He was born in Loughgur  and educated at Trinity College, Dublin. He was Chaplain of the Irish House of Commons then Archdeacon of Ossory from  1793 until 1795 when he became Bishop of Down and Connor. He died in January 1699.

References

Clergy from County Limerick
Irish Anglicans
Alumni of Trinity College Dublin
Archdeacons of Ossory
Bishops of Down and Connor
1699 deaths
Chaplains of the Irish House of Commons